Thom Kaumeyer (born March 17, 1967) is a former American football defensive back. He played for the Seattle Seahawks from 1989 to 1990. Kaumeyer played college football at the University of Oregon and was selected in the sixth round of the 1989 NFL Draft by the Los Angeles Rams.

References

1967 births
Living people
American football defensive backs
Oregon Ducks football players
Seattle Seahawks players
Atlanta Falcons coaches
Jacksonville Jaguars coaches
Palomar Comets football coaches
San Diego State Aztecs football coaches
Tulane Green Wave football coaches
Kentucky Wildcats football coaches
Hawaii Rainbow Warriors football coaches
Pasadena City Lancers football coaches